Jonathan Tokplé (born 29 July 1986) is a former professional footballer who played as a defender. Born in France, he made two FIFA-official appearances for the Togo national team, in 2006 and 2009.

Club career
Tokplé was born in Sarcelles, France. He was on trial at K.S.K. Beveren in summer 2007. He played in a reserve team game for English Conference National club York City in October, which York drew 0–0 with Hull City.

International career
Tokplé was invited to represent Togo instead of France. He was capped three times by Togo from 2006 to 2009.

References

External links
 
 

1986 births
Living people
People from Sarcelles
French sportspeople of Togolese descent
Citizens of Togo through descent
Footballers from Val-d'Oise
Association football defenders
French footballers
Togolese footballers
Togo international footballers
INF Clairefontaine players
Paris Saint-Germain F.C. players
Le Mans FC players
Villemomble Sports players
Balma SC players
Vierzon FC players
FC Fleury 91 players